In enzymology, a N-formylglutamate deformylase is an enzyme that catalyzes the chemical reaction

N-formyl-L-glutamate + H2O  formate + L-glutamate

Thus, the two substrates of this enzyme are N-formyl-L-glutamate and H2O, whereas its two products are formate and L-glutamate.

This enzyme belongs to the family of hydrolases, those acting on carbon-nitrogen bonds other than peptide bonds, specifically in linear amides.  The systematic name of this enzyme class is N-formyl-L-glutamate amidohydrolase. Other names in common use include beta-citryl-L-glutamate hydrolase, formylglutamate deformylase, N-formylglutamate hydrolase, beta-citrylglutamate amidase, beta-citryl-L-glutamate amidohydrolase, beta-citryl-L-glutamate amidase, beta-citrylglutamate amidase, and beta-citryl-L-glutamate-hydrolyzing enzyme.  This enzyme participates in histidine metabolism and glyoxylate and dicarboxylate metabolism.

References

 
 

EC 3.5.1
Enzymes of unknown structure